Paul R. House (born 1958) is an American Old Testament scholar, author, and seminary professor who served as 2012 president of the Evangelical Theological Society. He is professor of divinity at Beeson Divinity School, an interdenominational seminary in Birmingham, Alabama.

Biography 
He earned his B.A. from Southwest Baptist University, his M.A. from the  University of Missouri, and his M.Div. and Ph.D. from the Southern Baptist Theological Seminary.

House taught  at Taylor University for ten years before joining the faculty at The Southern Baptist Theological Seminary in 1996, where he was appointed by Albert Mohler as the first editor of The Southern Baptist Journal of Theology. From 1999 until 2001, he taught at Trinity Episcopal School for Ministry and was a member of the Translation Oversight Committee for the English Standard Version of the Bible. From 2001 until 2004, House was professor of Old Testament at Wheaton College. In 2004, House joined the faculty at Beeson Divinity School, where he continues to serve as Professor of Divinity, teaching Old Testament theology and Hebrew. In 2012, House served as the President of the Evangelical Theological Society.

Personal life 
House is married to Heather, a professional theological editor. His daughter, Molly, also pursued a bachelor degree of Biblical studies and completed a master in New Testament at Oxford University.

Works

References

1958 births
Living people
Southwest Baptist University alumni
University of Missouri alumni
Southern Baptist Theological Seminary alumni
Translators of the Bible into English
Old Testament scholars
Taylor University faculty
Wheaton College (Illinois) faculty
Samford University people
American biblical scholars
Bible commentators